Nakawa is an area in the city of Kampala, Uganda's capital. It is also the location of the headquarters of Nakawa Division, one of the five administrative divisions of Kampala.

Location
Nakawa is located on the eastern edge of the city of Kampala. It is bordered by Ntinda to the north, Kyambogo to the northeast, Banda and Kireka to the est, Mbuya to the southeast, Bugoloobi to the south, Namuwongo to the southwest, Kololo in Kampala Central Division to the west, and Naguru to the northwest. The coordinates of Nakawa are 0°19'59.0"N, 32°37'05.0"E (Latitude:0.333055; Longitude:32.618066).

Overview

Nakawa lies on the main highway between Kampala and Jinja. From a mere intersection of the Kampala-Jinja Highway and Ntinda Road' in the 1950s, Nakawa has grown into a bustling metropolitan area with small, medium, and large industries and some of Uganda's highest institutions of learning.

Landmarks
Nakawa has the following landmarks:

 headquarters of Nakawa Division
 headquarters of Uganda Revenue Authority
 Nakawa Farmers Market
 The offices of Uganda Securities Exchange
 Uganda Industrial Research Institute
 campus of Makerere University Business School
 Kampala-Jinja Highway traverses the northern part of Nakawa in a west–east direction.
 Minister's Village, an affluent residential area set in nearby Ntinda, another city neighborhood.
 Kyadondo Rugby Club ground, one of the locations bombed by Somalia's Shabab in the July 2010 Kampala attacks

See also

 Kampala Capital City Authority
 Luzira
 Kyambogo University

References

External links
 Kampala's Nakawa-Naguru Tenants to Benefit From Cheap Housing

Neighborhoods of Kampala
Nakawa Division